The name Kendra has been used for two cyclones in the Atlantic Ocean. It was used on the old four-year lists. 
 Tropical Storm Kendra (1966) – an eastern Atlantic October storm that was operationally declared a tropical storm but later determined to have not even been a tropical cyclone and was removed from the official records until 2022 when re-analysis determined it was a tropical cyclone.
 Hurricane Kendra (1978) – not a threat to land.

Atlantic hurricane set index articles